Losino-Petrovsky is a town in Moscow Oblast, Russia, located at the confluence of the Vorya and Klyazma Rivers  northeast of Moscow. Population:

History
In 1708, a manufacture for producing elk leather uniforms was established by Peter the Great. The sloboda around the manufacture was named Losinaya Petrovskaya. The manufacture existed until 1858, by which time several other textile factories were established. In 1928, the sloboda was granted urban-type settlement status, and in 1951—town status.

Administrative and municipal status
Within the framework of administrative divisions, it is incorporated as Losino-Petrovsky Town Under Oblast Jurisdiction—an administrative unit with the status equal to that of the districts. As a municipal division, Losino-Petrovsky Town Under Oblast Jurisdiction is incorporated as Losino-Petrovsky Urban Okrug.

Notable residents 

Aleksei Nikolayevich Leonov (born 1977), footballer
Aleksandr Markin (born 1962), hurdler

References

Notes

Sources

Cities and towns in Moscow Oblast